Johnny Angel is a 1945 film.

Johnny Angel may also refer to:

"Johnny Angel" (song), recorded by Shelley Fabares in 1962 
Johnny Angel (wrestler)
Johnny Angel, former guitarist with Talas, Michael Monroe, and Arcade
Johnny Angel and the Creations, an act on the Jamie Records label

See also
John Angel (disambiguation)